Magnus Broo (born 27 June 1965 in Husqvarna, Västervik, Småland, Sweden) is a Swedish jazz musician (trumpet) known from own recordings and collaboration with Norwegian jazz musicians like in the band Atomic.

Career 
Broo is the son of trumpeter, raised in Västervik, and participated in Visby big band before he attended musical training at North Texas State University (1984–1990). Back in Sweden, he was incorporated into Fredrik Norén Band (1991–1999), and also collaborated in the orchestra of Lennart Åberg.

Broo's expression is a continuation of free jazz and Ornette Coleman's style from the 1960'th, and he is central in the Norwegian/Swedish band Atomic (1999–). He also leads his own 'Magnus Broo Quartet with Torbjörn Gulz on piano, Mattias Welin on bass and Jonas Holgersson on drums. They released the albums Sudden Joy (1999), Levitaton (2001), Sugar Promise(2003) and Pain Body (2008). Moreover, he also collaborates in Fredrik Nordström Quintet.

Discography

Solo albums 

The Magnus Broo Quartet
1999: Sudden Joy (Dragon Records), live recording
2002: Levitation (Dragon Records)
2003: Sugarpromise (Moserobie Music)
2008: Painbody (Moserobie Music)

Magnus Broo Trio

 2018: Rules (Moserobie Music)

Other projects

2008: Game (PNL), with Paal Nilssen-Love
2010: Swedish Wood (Moserobie)
2013: Bubble (Moserobie)

Collaborations 

Within Atomic
2001: Feet Music (Jazzland Recordings)
2003: Boom Boom (Jazzland Recordings)
2004: Nuclear Assembly Hall (Okka Disk), with "School Days"
2005: The Bikini Tapes (Jazzland Recordings), live recording 
2006: Happy New Ears (Jazzland Recordings)
2008: Retrograde (Jazzland Recordings)
2008: Distil (Okka Disk), with "School Days"
2010: Theater Tilters (Jazzland Recordings)
2011: Here Comes Everybody (Jazzland Recordings)
2013: There's A Hole in the Mountain (Jazzland Recordings)
2015: Lucidity (Jazzland Recordings)
2017: Six Easy Pieces (Odin Records)
2018: Pet Variations (Odin Records)

With Fredrik Nordström Quintet
2004: Moment (Moserobie Music)
2005: No Sooner Said Than Done (Moserobie Music)
2008: Live in Coimbra (Clean Feed)

With Adam Lane, Ken Vandermark and Paal Nilssen-Love
2007: 4 Corners (Clean Feed)

Within "Boots Brown"
2007: Boots Brown (Slottet Records)
2014: Dashes To Dashes (Häpna Records)

Within "Angles"
2008: Every Woman Is A Tree (Clean Feed)
2010: Epileptical West : Live in Coimbra (Clean Feed)

With Marilyn Crispell
2009: Collaborations (Leo Records)

Within "The Godforgottens"
2009: Never Forgotten, Always Remembered (Clean Feed)

Within "IPA"
2009: Lorena (Bolage Records)
2011: It's A Delicate Thing (Bolage Records)

Within "The Resonance Ensemble"
2011: Kafka in Flight (Not Two Records)
2012: What Country Is This? (Not Two Records)
2013: Head Above Water, Feet Out of the Fire (Not Two Records)

Within "Platform"
2012: Takes Off (Clean Feed)

Within "Angles 9"
2013: In Our Midst (Clean Feed)
2014: Injury (Clean Feed)

References

External links 
Magnus Broo on Myspace
Review in Orkesterjournalen
fly.to/broo

1965 births
Living people
Swedish jazz composers
Male jazz composers
Swedish jazz trumpeters
Male trumpeters
21st-century trumpeters
21st-century Swedish male musicians
Atomic (band) members
Clean Feed Records artists